Sex, Money & Music is the seventh studio album by American hip hop group Above the Law. It was released on February 27, 2009 as a digital download, on the Beatology label. The record featured guest appearances from Kokane, Heather Hunter, Mannish Flats, Hazmad and Alan McNeil.

Its lead single, "Sex, Money & Music", was released in 2002 on their own West World Records and peaked at number 58 on the Hot R&B/Hip-Hop Songs. That same year, the complete album entitled Diary Of A Drug Dealer was recorded and supposed to be released through Death Row Records. However, it was reported that a deal could not be worked out between the group and the label, therefore the project was shelved indefinitely, until 2009.

Track listing

Chart positions
Billboard charts singles
"Sex, Money & Music" Hot R&B/Hip-Hop Songs (#58)

References

External links
 Discogs album release link
 Discogs single release link

2009 albums
Above the Law (group) albums